Coproporphyrinogen-III oxidase, mitochondrial (abbreviated as CPOX) is an enzyme that in humans is encoded by the CPOX gene. A genetic defect in the enzyme results in a reduced production of heme in animals. The medical condition associated with this enzyme defect is called hereditary coproporphyria.

CPOX, the sixth enzyme of the haem biosynthetic pathway, converts coproporphyrinogen III to protoporphyrinogen IX through two sequential steps of oxidative decarboxylation. The activity of the CPOX enzyme, located in the mitochondrial membrane, is measured in lymphocytes.

Function 
CPOX is an enzyme involved in the sixth step of porphyrin metabolism it catalyses the oxidative decarboxylation of coproporphyrinogen III to proto-porphyrinogen IX in the haem and chlorophyll biosynthetic pathways. The protein is a homodimer containing two internally bound iron atoms per molecule of native protein. The enzyme is active in the presence of molecular oxygen that acts as an electron acceptor. The enzyme is widely distributed having been found in a variety of eukaryotic and prokaryotic sources.

Structure

Gene
Human CPOX is a mitochondrial enzyme encoded by a 14 kb CPOX gene containing seven exons located on chromosome 3 at q11.2.

Protein
CPOX is expressed as a 40 kDa precursor and contains an amino terminal mitochondrial targeting signal. After proteolytic processing, the protein is present as a mature form of a homodimer with a molecular mass of 37 kDa.

Clinical significance
Hereditary coproporphyria (HCP) and harderoporphyria are two phenotypically separate disorders that concern partial deficiency of CPOX. Neurovisceral symptomatology predominates in HCP. Additionally, it may be associated with abdominal pain and/or skin photosensitivity. Hyper-excretion of coproporphyrin III in urine and faeces has been recorded in biochemical tests. HCP is an autosomal dominant inherited disorder, whereas harderoporphyria is a rare erythropoietic variant form of HCP and is inherited in an autosomal recessive fashion. Clinically, it is characterized by neonatal haemolytic anaemia. Sometimes, the presence of skin lesions with marked faecal excretion of harderoporphyrin is also described in harderoporphyric patients.

To date, over 50 CPOX mutations causing HCP have been described. Most of these mutations result in substitution of amino acid residues within the structural framework of CPOX. At least 32 of these mutations are considered to be disease-causing mutations. In terms of the molecular basis of HCP and harderoporphyria, mutations of CPOX in patients with harderoporphyria were demonstrated in the region of exon 6, where mutations in those with HCP were also identified.  As only patients with mutation in this region (K404E) would develop harderoporphyria, this mutation led to diminishment of the second step of the decarboxylation reaction during the conversion of coproporphyrinogen to protoporphyrinogen, implying that the active site of the enzyme involved in the second step of decarboxylation is located in exon 6.

Interactions 
CPOX has been shown to interact with the atypical keto-isocoproporphyrin (KICP) in human subjects with mercury (Hg) exposure.

References

Further reading

External links 
 

Protein families